To Let is the debut studio album from Australian roots musician Xavier Rudd. It was released in 2002 and peaked at No. 7 on the ARIA Hitseekers Albums Chart in March 2004.

Track listing

References

External links
 [ allmusic.com]

2002 debut albums
Xavier Rudd albums